Encephalartos horridus, the Eastern Cape blue cycad, is a small, low-growing cycad up to  high and  wide. It is a native of Eastern Cape Province, South Africa, and found in arid shrublands, most commonly on ridges and slopes with shallow soils. The species is particularly known for its distinctly blue-gray leaves, although the degree of coloration can vary significantly. The species name horridus is Latin for 'bristly', after the plant's stiff, spiny leaflets.

Description
Younger leaves are a silvery-blue colour but turn green with age.

Cones are usually brownish- or blackish-red and single with a dense layer of fine hair. Both male and female cones are produced. Seeds are roughly triangular with three flattened surfaces.

In the wild there is evidence of distinct variation within the species, including a possible 'dwarf' form found around Port Elizabeth.

Distribution
It prefers full sunlight and persists in a range of habitats including Karoo scrub, sourveld, deep fertile soil and open rocky ridges.

Eastern Cape blue cycads are now available as a result of commercial distribution in nurseries and gardens throughout the world.

Ecology
Cycads have few natural enemies; however, in the wild, they can be subject to predation from animals such as porcupines, baboons and certain insects. Although the Eastern Cape blue cycad can reproduce by suckering, more commonly reproduction requires insect pollination. Once seed cones have been pollinated seeds are spread by animals that eat the fleshy cones.

Conservation status
This cycad is listed as an endangered species by the 2003 IUCN Red List, a change from its vulnerable listing in the 1997 IUCN Red List of Threatened Plants. Historically it was over-collected in the wild but widespread availability in commercial nurseries has reduced some of this pressure.

Cultivation and propagation
Like all cycads, the Eastern Cape blue cycad is a slow grower. It responds well to deep, fertile soil enriched with compost. It is best suited to temperate and subtropical regions, however it can tolerate light to moderate frosts. It requires full sun, excellent drainage, not too much water and slightly acidic soil to prosper. It is common for the species to form new leaves and cones regularly. Plants are available from nurseries in many areas, however they are also easy to propagate from seeds. They can also be propagated from suckers with some patience and experience.

References

External links
 
 

horridus
Flora of the Cape Provinces
Garden plants
Endangered plants